MXR West Midlands was a regional commercial digital radio multiplex in the United Kingdom, which served the West Midlands. The multiplex closed on 27 August 2013 after the shareholders Global Radio & Arqiva decided not to renew the licence. The Bromsgrove transmitter frequency block transferred over to MuxCo Herefordshire and Worcestershire in September 2013.

Transmitters
MXR West Midlands was transmitted on frequency block 12A (223.936 MHz) from the transmitter sites:

Stations broadcast

Former stations
DNN  - Replaced by LBC 97.3 in September 2006.
Jazz FM 102.2 / Smooth FM 102.2 - London radio station broadcast from multiplex launch until launch of 105.7 Smooth Radio in March 2007
Saga 105.7 FM - Broadcast from October 2001 until station was rebranded to Smooth Radio in March 2007.
jazzfm.com - Internet station broadcast by GMG Radio from March 2007 to November 2007, when the station was replaced by Panjab Radio and Asian FX
Capital Disney - Originally named Cube, Capital Disney broadcast from September 2002 until closedown in June 2007. Replaced by UCB UK and UCB Inspirational in November 2007.
Real Radio Digital - Originally named Smooth Digital, and rebranded to Real Radio in June 2005 upon launch of Smooth FM 102.2. Closed down in October 2008 and replaced by TLRC's Jazz FM (UK).
UCB UK - Replaced by UCB Gospel in December 2009, following launch of UCB UK on national Digital One multiplex.
The Arrow - Replaced by local service Sanjhi Awaz Radio.
Asian FX - Closed on Friday February 11, 2011.
Jazz FM - Moved to Digital One full-time from 5 September 2011, replaced by 106.1 Real Radio XS Manchester.
Sanjhi Awaz Radio - Local Asian station which launched in April 2010, replacing The Arrow. Closed on 30 August 2012 due to financial difficulties.

See also
MXR North East
MXR North West
MXR Severn Estuary
MXR Yorkshire

References

Digital audio broadcasting multiplexes